Tim Gilmore is an English professor at Florida State College at Jacksonville (FSCJ) and an author. He 
founded the JaxbyJax Literary Arts  festival and posts on his website Jaxpsychogeo.com. He has written poetry, fiction, and non-fiction books on subjects including the history of Jacksonville, Eartha White, violent crime, island squatter Rollians Christopher, Virginia King, and Ottis Toole.

He conducted a phone interview of Ku Klux Klan bombing survivor and author Donal Godfrey.

He is married to fellow FSCJ English professor Jo Carlisle and has two daughters.

Tim Gilmore has two websites, jaxpsychogeo.comand tim-gilmore.com.

Books
Ghost Story / Love Song: A Collection Of Clues
Discarded Windows: Scenes Dreamt In Old Glass
Flights of Crows, Poems, 2002-2006
Fear, No More
This Kind of City: Ghost Stories and Psychological Landscapes
Murder Capital, 8 Stories 1890s - 1980s
Channeling Anna Fletcher; a nonfiction novel
Repossessions: Mass Shootings in Baymeadows
Goat Island Hermit; The State of Florida vs. Rollians Christopher
Central Florida Schizophrenia (Everyhing Buried Will Rise)
The Ocean Highway At Night
Ghost Compost: Strange Little Stories

Fiction
The Book of Isaiah: A Vision of the Founder of a City, illustrated by Shep Shepard

Non-fiction
The Devil in the Baptist Church: Bob Gray's Unholy Trinity
In Search of Eartha White: Storehouse for the People
The Mad Atlas of Virginia King
Stalking Ottis Toole: A Southern Gothic, he also adapted it as a play and it was staged at FSCJ

References

Living people
Year of birth missing (living people)
Florida State College at Jacksonville
Writers from Jacksonville, Florida
Historians of Florida